Dyschirius stellula is a species of ground beetle in the subfamily Scaritinae. It was described by Andrewes in 1936.

References

stellula
Beetles described in 1936